Nabil Salhi (born 22 May 1971) is a Tunisian wrestler. He competed in the men's Greco-Roman 57 kg at the 1996 Summer Olympics.

References

1971 births
Living people
Tunisian male sport wrestlers
Olympic wrestlers of Tunisia
Wrestlers at the 1996 Summer Olympics
Place of birth missing (living people)
20th-century Tunisian people